Kwekwe Central is a constituency of the National Assembly of the Parliament of Zimbabwe, centered on the city of Kwekwe in Midlands Province. It is currently represented by Judith Tobaiwa of the Citizens Coalition for Change, who was elected in a 26 March 2022 by-election. The previous MP for Kwekwe Central, Masango Matambanadzo of the National Patriotic Front, died on 28 July 2020.

Members 
An older constituency called Que Que (the town's colonial name until 1982) was represented in the Parliament of Rhodesia from 1928 until 1979.

References 

Kwekwe
Parliamentary constituencies in Zimbabwe